Lilies was the last album prior to a nine-year hiatus for Arovane, ending in 2013 with the release of Ve Palor.

Track listing
 "Ten Hours" (3:01)
 "Windy Wish Trees" (3:19)
 "Passage to Nagoya" (2:07)
 "Cry Osaka Cry" (5:08)
 "Pink Lilies" (4:00)
 "Lilies" (5:27)
 "Tokyo Ghost Stories" (5:07)
 "Instant Gods Out of the Box" (4:35)
 "Good Bye Forever" (3:48)

2000 albums
Arovane albums